Colonel Peter P Bellinger (March 1726 – 26 March 1813) was commander of the 4th Regiment, Tryon County militia under General Nicholas Herkimer. Peter P. Bellinger married Delia Herkimer, sister of General Herkimer, in January 1750. His homestead was located in Herkimer, New York, just west of the Foley Place on German Street. He was present at the Battle of Oriskany on August 6, 1777. He and Delia had nine children and are buried at the Northwest side of the original main door of the Fort Herkimer Church.

References

1726 births
1813 deaths
New York (state) militiamen in the American Revolution